The Africa Movie Academy Award for Most Promising Actor is an annual merit by the Africa Film Academy to recognize emerging talents in the African cinema. The category has been renamed and merged severally since it was first awarded in 2006.

References

Lists of award winners
Most Promising Actor Africa Movie Academy Award winners
Africa Movie Academy Awards